Abu Ishaq (literally "father of Isaac") may refer to:
 Abu Ishaq Muhammad al-Mutasim, Abbasid caliph (r. 833–842) and one of the most famous bearer of this Teknonym.
 Abu Ishaq Ahmad al-Tha'labi (died 1035/36), Persian scholar
 Abu Ishaq al-Fazari (died 805), Islamic historian, traditionalist and jurist
 Abu Ishaq Ibrahim al-Muttaqi, was the Caliph of Baghdad from 15 December 940 to 26 August 944.
 Abu Ishaq al-Heweny (born 1956), Egyptian Shafi'i scholar
 Abū Isḥāq al-Ilbirī, 11th-century Andalusian poet and faqīh
 Abu Ishaq al-Isfarayini (died 1027), medieval Sunni Islamic theologian
 Abu Ishaq al-Saffar al-Bukhari ( 1067–1139), Sunni theologian and Sufi
 Abu Ishaq al-Shatibi (1320–1388), Andalusian Maliki scholar
 Abu Ishaq al-Shirazi (1003–1083), Shafi'i-Ash'ari scholar
 Abu Ishaq al-Zouaoui (1394–1453), Algerian Maliki scholar
 Abu Ishaq Ibrahim (953 – after 978), Buyid prince
 Abu Ishaq Ibrahim I (1279–1283), Hafsid emir of Ifriqiya
 Abu Ishaq Ibrahim al-Istakhri (died after 952), Persian geographer
 Abu Ishaq Ibrahim al-Sahili  (c. 1290–1346), Andalusian poet and legal scholar
 Abū Isḥāq Ibrāhīm al-Zarqālī (1029–1087), Andalusian Muslim instrument maker
 Abu Ishaq Ibrahim of Ghazna, Turkic officer, who was the Samanid governor of Ghazna
 Abu Ishaq Ibrahim ibn al-Sari al-Zajjaj (c. 842–922), Iraqi grammarian
 Abu Ishaq Ibrahim ibn al-Mudabbir (died c. 893), Abbasid courtier
 Abu Ishaq Ibrahim ibn Khafaja (1058 – c. 1138), Andalusian poet
 Abu Ishaq Inju ( 1343–1357), last Injuid ruler
 Abu Ishaq Shami (died 940), Syrian Sufi and scholar

See also
 Boushaki (disambiguation)